Zhudilovo is a rural locality (a settlement) in Unechsky District, Bryansk Oblast, Russia. The population was 218 as of 2013. There are 9 streets.

Geography 
Zhudilovo is located 47 km east of Unecha (the district's administrative centre) by road. Staroselye is the nearest rural locality.

References 

Rural localities in Unechsky District